Roy Moore (1893-1980) was a wrestling and judo coach, best known for instituting the weight class system in judo. 
Moore was trained by Frank Gotch. He earned the World Wrestling Championship title in Chicago beating judoka and wrestler Manjiro "Matty" Matsuda.  Matsuda later became his judo coach. Moore earned a fifth degree black belt in judo.  He later joined the US Navy.

Moore was described as a "forgotten pioneer of judo" in an article written by Haywood Nikosha. Moore, at the request of Jigoro Kano, implemented the weight class system in judo. He later served as the first Olympic coach for Japan's wrestling team in 1932.  His son, Roy H. Moore, Jr was the former Olympic Judo Wrestling Coach.

References 

1893 births
1980 deaths
American catch wrestlers
American male professional wrestlers
American Olympic coaches
American male judoka